Richard Andrew Rosser, Baron Rosser (born 5 October 1944) is a British former trade union leader and Labour politician, sitting in the House of Lords. He is the Shadow Spokesperson for Transport and Home Affairs for Labour in the House of Lords.

Trade Union career
Initially employed by London Transport he joined the staff of the Transport Salaried Staffs' Association (TSSA) early in his working career, representing London Transport's white-collar staff in negotiations with the management. He rose through the ranks of the TSSA to be an Assistant General Secretary (one of two, at the time), and in 1989 he was elected General Secretary of the union (i.e. in day-to-day control, but answerable to an elected Executive Committee of lay members, and to the Annual Conference). Rosser was re-elected twice, serving a total of fifteen years in office before his retirement in 2004 – a record second only to the thirty years (1906-1936) served by Alexander Walkden.

During his time at the TSSA, Rosser was also a magistrate and was Chairman of the National Executive Committee of the Labour Party in 1997–98.

Political activity
Rosser was the Labour candidate for Croydon Central at the general election of February 1974, but was not elected.

House of Lords
Following his retirement from TSSA he was created a life peer on 14 June 2004 as Baron Rosser, of Ickenham in the London Borough of Hillingdon, taking his seat in the House of Lords on the Labour Party benches in the summer of 2004. In addition to transport matters, he takes an interest in penal policy, being chair of the Prison Service Audit Committee and a non-executive member of the Prison Service change programme board.

He has served as an Opposition Whip and Spokesperson for the Labour Party on defence, home affairs and transport at various times since 2010.

References

External links
House of Lords member profile.

1944 births
People educated at Haydon School
Living people
General Secretaries of the Transport Salaried Staffs' Association
Labour Party (UK) life peers
Chairs of the Labour Party (UK)
Labour Party (UK) parliamentary candidates
Members of the General Council of the Trades Union Congress
Life peers created by Elizabeth II